Lithuanian broadcaster LRT announced their debut for Junior Eurovision Song Contest 2007. The National Final, "Mažųjų žvaigždžių ringas" chose Lina Joy (Lina Jurevičiūtė) to represent Lithuania in the Junior Eurovision Song Contest 2007.

Before Junior Eurovision

Mažųjų žvaigždžių ringas 
The national selection show Mažųjų žvaigždžių ringas consisted of six semi-finals held between 9 September and 14 October 2007 and a final held on 21 October 2007.

In the semi-finals, two entries qualified to the final. The entry that received the most points from a three-member jury panel qualified for the final. An additional qualifier was selected from the remaining four entries by televoting. LRT also reserved the right to select a wildcard act for the final out of the remaining non-qualifying acts from the semi-finals. In the final, the winner was determined by a 50/50 combination of votes from a five-member jury panel and public televoting.

Semi-final 1
The first semi-final was held on 9 September 2007. Two entries qualified to the final. The entry that received the most points from a three-member jury panel qualified for the final. An additional qualifier was selected from the remaining four entries by televoting. The members of the jury consisted of Aistė Smilgevičiūtė, Linas Adomaitis and Laurynas Šarkinas.

Semi-final 2
The second semi-final was held on 16 September 2007. Two entries were to qualify to the final. However, as both the jury and televoting had the same winner, only Evelina Bučinskaitė & Tiks qualified for the final. The members of the jury consisted of Julija Ritčik, Viktoras Diawara and Rūta Ščiogolevaitė.

Semi-final 3
The third semi-final was held on 23 September 2007. Two entries qualified to the final. The entry that received the most points from a three-member jury panel qualified for the final. An additional qualifier was selected from the remaining four entries by televoting. The members of the jury consisted of Arnoldas Lukošius, Saulius Urbonavičius and Aistė Pilvelytė.

Semi-final 4
The fourth semi-final was held on 30 September 2007. Two entries qualified to the final. The entry that received the most points from a three-member jury panel qualified for the final. An additional qualifier was selected from the remaining four entries by televoting. The members of the jury consisted of Vytautas Juozapaitis, Eva and Tomas Sinickis.

Semi-final 5
The fifth semi-final was held on 7 October 2007. Two entries qualified to the final. The entry that received the most points from a three-member jury panel qualified for the final. An additional qualifier was selected from the remaining four entries by televoting. The members of the jury consisted of Jurgis Didžiulis, Raigardas Tautkus and Vladas Kovaliovas.

Semi-final 6
The sixth semi-final was held on 14 October 2007. Two entries qualified to the final. The entry that received the most points from a three-member jury panel qualified for the final. An additional qualifier was selected from the remaining four entries by televoting. The members of the jury consisted of Aras Vėberis, Rosita Čivilytė and Nėrius Pečiūra.

Final
The final was held on 21 October 2007 at the LRT TV Studios in Vilnius, where 12 participants competed. The winner was chosen by televoting (50%) and a five-member "expert" jury (50%). The members of the jury consisted of Rosita Čivilytė, Darius Užkuraitis, Saulius Urbonavičius, Darius Užkuraitis and Deivis.

At Junior Eurovision

Voting

Notes

References

Junior Eurovision Song Contest
Junior
Greece